Jesse Cardoza is a fictional character on the CBS crime drama CSI: Miami, portrayed by Eddie Cibrian until the character's death in the ninth season opening episode "Fallen".

Background
In 1997, Cardoza left the Miami-Dade Police Department, transferring to the Los Angeles Police Department following the conclusion of a case which led to Horatio Caine becoming the lead CSI Agent. Although Jesse didn't say it, presumably the reason why he left Miami for Los Angeles was due to a disappointment in love. He recommended the hire of Tim Speedle to Horatio. Cardoza returned in 2009 as a member of Caine's team.

Jesse was a womanizer although very discreet in this matter and in the Season 8 episode, "L.A", it was revealed that a lack of evidence on a case involving the man suspected of killing of a woman whom Cardoza called "my wife" cost his job as a Los Angeles Police Officer and left his reputation in tatters. This later prompted him to rejoin the Miami Dade Police Department where he eventually became a CSI.

His first reappearance is in the episode "Hostile Takeover", when he is shown talking to a receptionist. A mentally unstable man then takes him and three others hostage. In the episode's conclusion, Jesse returns to Horatio's team. Horatio welcomes him back and tells him to replace his LAPD badge with the MDPD badge.

Death
Cardoza is in the crime lab when it is poisoned with Halon gas by serial killer Bob Starling, and dies after he hits and cuts his head during his fall, suffering a subdural hemorrhage. The other team members attempt to revive him without success.

Walter is the one most hit by his death and talks to his body about a basketball game they had planned for that night, and about Walter's having called Cardoza's mother, who wants her son to be buried in California; Walter says Horatio is arranging it. Walter also discovered the key to Jesse's death which was his head was stabbed by a piece of glass from the camera of Bob Starling that he was investigating before he was killed, Walter uses this discovery to investigate the memory card full of deleted photos which later got restored once the Crime Lab's servers were back online and the CSIs discover who truly killed Jesse for Starling.

Horatio Caine leads the manhunt for Starling all over the city. Starling tries to evade justice goading Caine into killing him via suicide by cop, but Caine will not allow Starling to get off that easy and Caine is able to formally arrest Starling for first degree murder of a police officer and attempted murder of the rest of the team.

At the end of the episode, Walter is at the basketball court, shooting baskets when the rest of the CSI team show up and split into teams for a game. Eric passes the ball to Horatio who says, "This is for Jesse", before making a perfect shot.

Personal life
While Cardoza hid a lot his private life, it's know he liked women very much. A mileage discrepancy in the vehicle logs from a day when Calleigh lent him her Hummer led her to confront Cardoza about the differences. After a heated discussion, Cardoza then tells Calleigh that he was following a woman who was living with a serial killer he had investigated during his time in LA, who had also killed his supposed wife Tracy. He seemed to felt guilty about her murder.

CSI: Miami characters
Television characters introduced in 2009
Fictional Los Angeles Police Department detectives
Fictional Miami-Dade Police Department detectives